Jean-Pierre Blackburn,  (born July 6, 1948) is a Canadian politician and diplomat. He was the Conservative Member of Parliament (MP) for the riding of Jonquière—Alma from 2006 to 2011; earlier, he was the Progressive Conservative MP for Jonquière from 1984 to 1993.

Blackburn was born in Jonquière, Quebec. In 1993, Blackburn was the Parliamentary Secretary to the Minister of National Defence.  On February 6, 2006, he was appointed Minister of Labour and Housing in Prime Minister Stephen Harper's Cabinet.  He was shuffled to the National Revenue portfolio on October 30, 2008, and became Minister of Veterans Affairs in 2010.. In the May 2011 federal election, Blackburn lost to the NDP candidate, Claude Patry.

A businessman, Blackburn holds a bachelor's degree in administration and a master's in regional studies and intervention from the Université du Québec à Chicoutimi. He has also been a manager, administrator and a professor. More recently, he has been the president of Blackburn Communications Inc.

He was named Canada's Ambassador and Permanent Delegate to UNESCO in December 2011.

In May 2017, Jean-Pierre Blackburn became leader of the Citizens' Party of Saguenay in order to be a candidate for Mayor's office in the November municipal election.

References

External links
 

1948 births
Conservative Party of Canada MPs
French Quebecers
Living people
Members of the House of Commons of Canada from Quebec
Members of the King's Privy Council for Canada
Politicians from Saguenay, Quebec
Progressive Conservative Party of Canada MPs
Université du Québec à Chicoutimi alumni
Permanent Delegates of Canada to UNESCO
Members of the 28th Canadian Ministry
Ministers of Labour of Canada